Silvia Farina and Andrea Temesvári were the defending champions but did not compete that year.

Janette Husárová and Natalia Medvedeva won in the final 6–4, 7–5 against Lenka Cenková and Kateřina Šišková.

Seeds
Champion seeds are indicated in bold text while text in italics indicates the round in which those seeds were eliminated.

 Wiltrud Probst /  Elena Pampoulova (quarterfinals)
 Sandra Cecchini /  Laura Garrone (semifinals)
 Radka Bobková /  Eva Melicharová (semifinals)
 Cătălina Cristea /  Flora Perfetti (first round)

Draw

External links
 1996 Meta Styrian Open Doubles Draw

WTA Austrian Open
1996 WTA Tour